The Sikorsky S-15 was a single engine light bomber floatplane built in 1913 at the  Russian Baltic Railroad Car Works while Igor Sikorsky was the chief engineer of the aircraft manufacturing division. Similar in design to the Sikorsky S-10, only one example of this biplane was produced.

References

S-15
Biplanes
S-15
Single-engined tractor aircraft
Aircraft first flown in 1913